Diborane(2) or diborene is a theoretical/hypothetical inorganic compound with the formula B2H2. Diborenes also refers to a series of molecules with a formula R:(BH)=(BH):R, where R is an organic group. B2H2 are unstable under ambient conditions. They are synthesized by pulsed laser ablation of boron in a mixed hydrogen-argon gas atmosphere. Upon cooling the mixture, the argon gas changes into a solid, thereby stabilizing the trapped diboranes.

B2H2 is a linear molecule with a triplet ground state, as revealed by electron paramagnetic resonance, and shows an antisymmetric stretching mode at 2679.9 cm–1.

References 

Boranes